MICS or mics may refer to:
Master of Information and Cybersecurity
Medical Implant Communication Service, a specification for a frequency band used by medical implants
 Microphones
 Minimal inhibitory concentrations, in microbiology, the lowest concentrations of antimicrobials that will inhibit growth of a microorganism
 Minimally invasive cardiac surgery, refers to alternative approaches to heart surgery, making use of several small incisions instead of the traditional open-chest procedure
 Multiple Indicator Cluster Survey, a household survey program developed by UNICEF
 Member of the Irish Computer Society
 Member of the Institute of Chartered Shipbrokers
 Modular Integrated Communications System (MICS), a phone system by Norstar

See also
MIC (disambiguation)